In mathematics, ancient Egyptian multiplication (also known as Egyptian multiplication, Ethiopian multiplication, Russian multiplication, or peasant multiplication), one of two multiplication methods used by scribes, is a systematic method for multiplying two numbers that does not require the multiplication table, only the ability to multiply and divide by 2, and to add. It decomposes one of the multiplicands (preferably the smaller) into a set of numbers of powers of two and then creates a table of doublings of the second multiplicand by every value of the set which is summed up to give result of multiplication.

This method may be called mediation and duplation, where mediation means halving one number and duplation means doubling the other number. It is still used in some areas.

The second Egyptian multiplication and division technique was known from the hieratic Moscow and Rhind Mathematical Papyri written in the seventeenth century B.C. by the scribe Ahmes.

Although in ancient Egypt the concept of base 2 did not exist, the algorithm is essentially the same algorithm as long multiplication after the multiplier and multiplicand are converted to binary. The method as interpreted by conversion to binary is therefore still in wide use today as implemented by binary multiplier circuits in modern computer processors.

Method

The ancient Egyptians had laid out tables of a great number of powers of two, rather than recalculating them each time.  The decomposition of a number thus consists of finding the powers of two which make it up.  The Egyptians knew empirically that a given power of two would only appear once in a number.  For the decomposition, they proceeded methodically; they would initially find the largest power of two less than or equal to the number in question, subtract it out and repeat until nothing remained.  (The Egyptians did not make use of the number zero in mathematics.)

After the decomposition of the first multiplicand, the person would construct a table of powers of two times the second multiplicand (generally the smaller) from one up to the largest power of two found during the decomposition.

The result is obtained by adding the numbers from the second column for which the corresponding power of two makes up part of the decomposition of the first multiplicand.

Example

25 × 7 = ?

Decomposition of the number 25:

{|
| The largest power of two less than or equal to 25 || is 16: || style="text-align:center;"| 25 − 16 || = 9.
|-
| The largest power of two less than or equal to  9 || is  8: || style="text-align:center;"|  9 −  8 || = 1.
|-
| The largest power of two less than or equal to  1 || is  1: || style="text-align:center;"|  1 −  1 || = 0.
|-
| colspan="3" | 25 is thus the sum of: 16, 8 and 1.
|}

The largest power of two is 16 and the second multiplicand is 7.

As 25 = 16 + 8 + 1, the corresponding multiples of 7 are added to get 25 × 7 = 112 + 56 + 7 = 175.

Russian peasant multiplication 
In the Russian peasant method, the powers of two in the decomposition of the multiplicand are found by writing it on the left and progressively halving the left column, discarding any remainder, until the value is 1 (or −1, in which case the eventual sum is negated), while doubling the right column as before. Lines with even numbers on the left column are struck out, and the remaining numbers on the right are added together.

Example

238 × 13 = ?

See also 
Egyptian fraction
Egyptian mathematics
Multiplication algorithms
Binary numeral system
Bharati Krishna Tirtha's Vedic mathematics

References

Other sources
 Boyer, Carl B. (1968) A History of Mathematics. New York: John Wiley.
 Brown, Kevin S. (1995) The Akhmin Papyrus 1995 --- Egyptian Unit Fractions.
 Bruckheimer, Maxim, and Y. Salomon (1977) "Some Comments on R. J. Gillings' Analysis of the 2/n Table in the Rhind Papyrus," Historia Mathematica 4: 445–52.
 Bruins, Evert M. (1953) Fontes matheseos: hoofdpunten van het prae-Griekse en Griekse wiskundig denken. Leiden: E. J. Brill.
 ------- (1957) "Platon et la table égyptienne 2/n," Janus 46: 253–63.
Bruins, Evert M (1981) "Egyptian Arithmetic," Janus 68: 33–52.
 ------- (1981) "Reducible and Trivial Decompositions Concerning Egyptian Arithmetics," Janus 68: 281–97.
 Burton, David M. (2003) History of Mathematics: An Introduction. Boston Wm. C. Brown.
 Chace, Arnold Buffum, et al. (1927) The Rhind Mathematical Papyrus. Oberlin: Mathematical Association of America.
 Cooke, Roger (1997) The History of Mathematics. A Brief Course. New York, John Wiley & Sons.
 Couchoud, Sylvia. "Mathématiques égyptiennes". Recherches sur les connaissances mathématiques de l'Egypte pharaonique., Paris, Le Léopard d'Or, 1993.
 Daressy, Georges. "Akhmim Wood Tablets", Le Caire Imprimerie de l'Institut Francais d'Archeologie Orientale, 1901, 95–96.
 Eves, Howard (1961) An Introduction to the History of Mathematics. New York, Holt, Rinehard & Winston.
 Fowler, David H. (1999) The mathematics of Plato's Academy: a new reconstruction. Oxford Univ. Press.
 Gardiner, Alan H. (1957) Egyptian Grammar being an Introduction to the Study of Hieroglyphs. Oxford University Press.
 Gardner, Milo (2002) "The Egyptian Mathematical Leather Roll, Attested Short Term and Long Term" in History of the Mathematical Sciences, Ivor Grattan-Guinness, B.C. Yadav (eds), New Delhi, Hindustan Book Agency:119-34.
 -------- "Mathematical Roll of Egypt" in Encyclopaedia of the History of Science, Technology, and Medicine in Non-Western Cultures. Springer, Nov. 2005.
 Gillings, Richard J. (1962) "The Egyptian Mathematical Leather Roll," Australian Journal of Science 24: 339–44. Reprinted in his (1972) Mathematics in the Time of the Pharaohs. MIT Press. Reprinted by Dover Publications, 1982.
 -------- (1974) "The Recto of the Rhind Mathematical Papyrus: How Did the Ancient Egyptian Scribe Prepare It?" Archive for History of Exact Sciences 12: 291–98.
 -------- (1979) "The Recto of the RMP and the EMLR," Historia Mathematica, Toronto 6 (1979), 442–447.
 -------- (1981) "The Egyptian Mathematical Leather Role–Line 8. How Did the Scribe Do it?" Historia Mathematica: 456–57.
 Glanville, S.R.K. "The Mathematical Leather Roll in the British Museum" Journal of Egyptian Archaeology 13, London (1927): 232–8
 Griffith, Francis Llewelyn. The Petrie Papyri. Hieratic Papyri from Kahun and Gurob (Principally of the Middle Kingdom), Vols. 1, 2. Bernard Quaritch, London, 1898.
 Gunn, Battiscombe George. Review of The Rhind Mathematical Papyrus by T. E. Peet. The Journal of Egyptian Archaeology 12 London, (1926): 123–137.
 Hultsch, F. Die Elemente der Aegyptischen Theihungsrechmun 8, Übersicht über die Lehre von den Zerlegangen, (1895):167-71.
 Imhausen, Annette. "Egyptian Mathematical Texts and their Contexts", Science in Context 16, Cambridge (UK), (2003): 367–389.
 Joseph, George Gheverghese. The Crest of the Peacock/the non-European Roots of Mathematics, Princeton, Princeton University Press, 2000
 Klee, Victor, and Wagon, Stan. Old and New Unsolved Problems in Plane Geometry and Number Theory, Mathematical Association of America, 1991.
Knorr, Wilbur R. "Techniques of Fractions in Ancient Egypt and Greece". Historia Mathematica 9 Berlin, (1982): 133–171.
 Legon, John A.R. "A Kahun Mathematical Fragment". Discussions in Egyptology, 24 Oxford, (1992).
 Lüneburg, H. (1993) "Zerlgung von Bruchen in Stammbruche" Leonardi Pisani Liber Abbaci oder Lesevergnügen eines Mathematikers, Wissenschaftsverlag, Mannheim: 81=85.
 
 Robins, Gay. and Charles Shute, The Rhind Mathematical Papyrus: an Ancient Egyptian Text" London, British Museum Press, 1987.
 Roero, C. S. "Egyptian mathematics" Companion Encyclopedia of the History and Philosophy of the Mathematical Sciences" I. Grattan-Guinness (ed), London, (1994): 30–45.
 Sarton, George. Introduction to the History of Science, Vol I, New York, Williams & Son, 1927
 Scott, A. and Hall, H.R., "Laboratory Notes: Egyptian Mathematical Leather Roll of the Seventeenth Century BC", British Museum Quarterly, Vol 2, London, (1927): 56.
 Sylvester, J. J. "On a Point in the Theory of Vulgar Fractions": American Journal of Mathematics, 3 Baltimore (1880): 332–335, 388–389.
 Vogel, Kurt. "Erweitert die Lederolle unserer Kenntniss ägyptischer Mathematik Archiv für Geschichte der Mathematik, V 2, Julius Schuster, Berlin (1929): 386-407
 van der Waerden, Bartel Leendert. Science Awakening, New York, 1963
 Hana Vymazalova, The Wooden Tablets from Cairo:The Use of the Grain Unit HK3T in Ancient Egypt, Archiv Orientalai, Charles U Prague, 2002.

External links
http://rmprectotable.blogspot.com/ RMP 2/n table
https://web.archive.org/web/20130625181118/http://weekly.ahram.org.eg/2007/844/heritage.htm
http://emlr.blogspot.com Egyptian Mathematical Leather Roll
https://web.archive.org/web/20120913011126/http://planetmath.org/encyclopedia/FirstLCMMethodRedAuxiliaryNumbers.html
https://web.archive.org/web/20120606142257/http://planetmath.org/encyclopedia/RationalNumbers.html
http://mathforum.org/kb/message.jspa?messageID=6579539&tstart=0 Math forum and two ways to calculate 2/7
 New and Old classifications of Ahmes Papyrus
 Russian Peasant Multiplication
 The Russian Peasant Algorithm (pdf file)
 Peasant Multiplication from cut-the-knot
 Egyptian Multiplication by Ken Caviness, The Wolfram Demonstrations Project.
 Russian Peasant Multiplication at The Daily WTF
 Michael S. Schneider explains how the Ancient Egyptians (and Chinese) and modern computers multiply and divide
 Russian Multiplication - Numberphile

Egyptian mathematics
Multiplication
Number theoretic algorithms
Egyptian fractions
Ancient Egyptian literature
Mathematics manuscripts